Jordan Watson Scott is a British filmmaker and photographer. She is the daughter of director Sir Ridley Scott and advertising executive Sandy Watson. She is the niece of director Tony Scott and half-sister of directors Luke and Jake Scott.

Scott directed the feature film Cracks, an adaptation of a novel by Sheila Kohler. She also directed All the Invisible Children (Segment Jonathan), Portrait, and Never Never. She has directed commercials for Prada, Nike, Amazon.com and Land Rover.

Filmography

References

External links
 

Living people
English women film directors
Film directors from London
Photographers from London
Jordan
Year of birth missing (living people)